Stay with Me Tonight may refer to:

Stay with Me Tonight (album) or the title song, by Jeffrey Osborne, 1983
"Stay with Me Tonight" (Eugent Bushpepa song), 2020
"Stay with Me Tonight" (The Human League song), 1996
"Stay with Me Tonight" (TVXQ song), 2005
"Stay with Me Tonight", by Mandy Smith from Mandy, 1988; co-written and originally recorded by Rick Astley
"Stay with Me Tonight", by Quiet Riot from QR 1988